Susan Batten is an actress, producer and writer.

Early life and education 
Raised in Clayton, North Carolina, Batten graduated from University of North Carolina School of the Arts and Columbia University School of the Arts.

Career 
Batten portrayed Luna Moody Holden on One Life to Live, a role she originally played from 1991 to 1995.

In New York City, Batten was a member of The Edge Theatre company, along with Mary-Louise Parker, Peter Hedges and Joe Mantello. Off-Broadway, she co-starred with Julie Harris in The Fiery Furnace, and portrayed Connor Walsh on CBS’s As The World Turns in 1997-98.

She guest-starred in sitcoms and dramas on ABC, CBS and Fox before she began her writing career. Batten earned her MFA from Columbia University School Of The Arts in screenwriting and directing, and was the recipient of the Dean’s Fellowship. She wrote and produced the film Showing Roots starring Maggie Grace, Uzo Aduba, Elizabeth McGovern, Adam Broady and Cicely Tyson. She co-wrote Love, Once and Always for Hallmark Channel.

Filmography

Film

Television

References

External links

Living people
American soap opera actresses
American television actresses
Actresses from North Carolina
People from Johnston County, North Carolina
People from Clayton, North Carolina
Louisburg College alumni
21st-century American women
Year of birth missing (living people)